The Export Administration Regulations (EAR) are a set of regulations found at 15 C.F.R. § 730 et seq. They are administered by the Bureau of Industry and Security, which is part of the US Commerce Department. The EAR regulates export and export restrictions: whether a person may export something from the U.S.; re-export something from a foreign country; or transfer something from one person to another in a foreign country. The EAR applies to physical objects - sometimes referred to as "commodities" - as well as intellectual property such as technology and software.

Classification 
The EAR contains a list called the Commerce Control List (CCL). The CCL is a limited list of items within the scope of the EAR which merit particular attention because they could potentially have a military use in addition to commercial use. CCL-listed items are therefore often referred to as "dual use." The CCL, however, is not an exhaustive list of things that are within the scope of the EAR; to the contrary, the overwhelming majority of things that fall within the scope of the EAR are not listed on the CCL; instead, they are given the designation "EAR99."

Items that are listed on the CCL are organized according to alpha-numeric designations called "Export Control Classification Numbers" (ECCNs).

Definitions

Definition of export 
With a few exceptions, the EAR defines "export" to mean:

 (1) An actual shipment or transmission out of the United States, including the sending or taking of an item out of the United States, in any manner;
 (2) Releasing or otherwise transferring “technology” or source code (but not object code) to a foreign person in the United States (a “deemed export”);
 (3) Transferring by a person in the United States of registration, control, or ownership of spacecraft, under certain circumstances.

Definition of reexport 
Once a thing has been exported from the United States to a foreign country, the EAR defines "reexport" to mean a subsequent export of the thing from the first foreign country to a second foreign country, and to any subsequent export after that.

Definition of technology 
The EAR defines "technology" to mean information necessary for the “development,” “production,” “use,” operation, installation, maintenance, repair, overhaul, or refurbishing (or other terms specified in ECCNs on the CCL that control “technology”) of an item.

“Technology” may be in any tangible or intangible form, such as written or oral communications, blueprints, drawings, photographs, plans, diagrams, models, formulae, tables, engineering designs and specifications, computer-aided design files, manuals or documentation, electronic media or information revealed through visual inspection.

The 10 General Prohibitions 
The EAR contains a list of rules called the 10 General Prohibitions, which provide as follows:

General Prohibition 1 
You may not, without a license or License Exception, export any item subject to the EAR to another country or reexport any item of U.S.-origin if each of the following is true:

(i) The item is controlled for a reason indicated in the applicable Export Control Classification Number (ECCN), and

(ii) Export to the country of destination requires a license for the control reason as indicated on the Country Chart at part 738 of the EAR.

General Prohibition 2 
You may not, without a license or license exception, reexport or export from abroad foreign-made commodities that incorporate controlled U.S.-origin commodities, foreign-made commodities that are “bundled” with controlled U.S.-origin software, foreign-made software that is commingled with controlled U.S.-origin software, or foreign-made technology that is commingled with controlled U.S.-origin technology if such items require a license according to any of the provisions in the EAR and incorporate or are commingled with more than a de minimis amount of controlled U.S. content, as defined in §734.4 of the EAR concerning the scope of the EAR.

General Prohibition 3 
General Prohibition 3 applies to certain items that are produced outside of the U.S. and that are the "direct product" of U.S. technology or software, or they are developed from a plat that is the "direct product" of U.S. technology or software.

Under General Prohibition 3, you may not, without a license or license exception, reexport any item that meets the direct product test to a destination in Country Group D:1, E:1, or E:2 (See supplement no.1 to part 740 of the EAR). Additionally, you may not, without a license or license exception, reexport or export from abroad any ECCN 0A919 commodities (foreign-made military commodities) that meet the direct product test to a destination in Country Group D:1, D:3, D:4, D:5, E:1, or E:2.

General Prohibition 4 
You may not take any action that is prohibited by a denial order issued under 15 CFR Part 766. These orders prohibit many actions in addition to direct exports by the person denied export privileges, including some transfers within a single country, either in the United States or abroad, by other persons. You are responsible for ensuring that any of your transactions in which a person who is denied export privileges are involved do not violate the terms of the order. Orders denying export privileges are published in the Federal Register when they are issued and are legally controlling documents in accordance with their terms. BIS also maintains compilations of persons denied export privileges on its Web site at http://www.bis.doc.gov. BIS may, on an exceptional basis, authorize activity otherwise prohibited by a denial order. See 15 CFR §764.3(a)(2).

General Prohibition 5 
You may not, without a license, knowingly export or reexport any item subject to the EAR to an end-user or end-use that is prohibited by part 744 of the EAR.

General Prohibition 6 
You may not, without a license or License Exception authorized under part 746, export or reexport any item subject to the EAR to any of the following countries:

 Cuba;
 North Korea;
 Russia (with respect to Russian oil and gas industries);
 Crimea region of Ukraine;
 Iran;
 Syria;

General Prohibition 7 
U.S. persons may not perform certain activities relating to nuclear explosive devices, missiles, chemical or biological weapons, or semiconductor equipment as set out in 15 CFR § 744.6.

General Prohibition 8 
Under General Prohibition 8, if you export or reexport an item, it may not pass through any of the following countries without a license:

 Armenia
 Azerbaijan
 Belarus
 Cambodia
 Cuba
 Georgia
 Kazakhstan
 Kyrgyzstan
 Laos
 Mongolia
 North Korea
 Russia
 Tajikistan
 Turkmenistan
 Ukraine
 Uzbekistan
 Vietnam

General Prohibition 9 
You may not violate terms or conditions of a license or of a License Exception issued under or made a part of the EAR, and you may not violate any order issued under or made a part of the EAR.

General Prohibition 10 
You may not sell, transfer, export, reexport, finance, order, buy, remove, conceal, store, use, loan, dispose of, transport, forward, or otherwise service, in whole or in part, any item subject to the EAR and exported or to be exported with knowledge that a violation of the Export Administration Regulations, the Export Administration Act or any order, license, License Exception, or other authorization issued thereunder has occurred, is about to occur, or is intended to occur in connection with the item. Nor may you rely upon any license or License Exception after notice to you of the suspension or revocation of that license or exception.

Scope of the Export Administration Regulations

General applicability 
The EAR have very broad application. With only the exceptions noted below, the EAR apply to the following categories of things:

 All items in the United States, including in a U.S. Foreign Trade Zone or moving in transit through the United States from one foreign country to another;
 All U.S. origin items wherever located;
 Foreign-made commodities that incorporate controlled U.S.-origin commodities, foreign-made commodities that are ‘bundled’ with controlled U.S.-origin software, foreign-made software that is commingled with controlled U.S.-origin software, and foreign-made technology that is commingled with controlled U.S.-origin technology in certain quantities (see the "de minimis" rules found at 15 CFR part 734);
 Certain foreign-made direct products of U.S. origin technology or software, as described in 15 CFR §736.2(b)(3); and
 Certain commodities produced by any plant or major component of a plant located outside the United States that is a direct product of U.S.-origin technology or software, as described in §736.2(b)(3) of the EAR.

Exceptions to EAR applicability 
The EAR do not apply, however, to the following:

 Items that are exclusively controlled for export or reexport by the following departments and agencies of the U.S. Government which regulate exports or reexports for national security or foreign policy purposes:
Department of State. The International Traffic in Arms Regulations (22 CFR parts 120-130) administered by the Directorate of Defense Trade Controls relate to defense articles and defense services on the U.S. Munitions List (22 CFR part 121). Section 38 of the Arms Export Control Act (22 U.S.C. 2778). (Also see paragraph (b)(1)(vi) of this section).
 Treasury Department, Office of Foreign Assets Control (OFAC). Regulations administered by OFAC implement broad controls and embargo transactions with certain foreign countries. These regulations include controls on exports and reexports to certain countries (31 CFR chapter V). Trading with the Enemy Act (50 U.S.C. app. section 1 et seq.), and International Emergency Economic Powers Act (50 U.S.C. 1701, et seq.)
 U.S. Nuclear Regulatory Commission (NRC). Regulations administered by NRC control the export and reexport of commodities related to nuclear reactor vessels (10 CFR part 110). Atomic Energy Act of 1954, as amended (42 U.S.C. part 2011 et seq.).
 Department of Energy (DOE). Regulations administered by DOE control the export and reexport of technology related to the production of special nuclear materials (10 CFR part 810). Atomic Energy Act of 1954, as amended (42 U.S.C. section 2011 et seq.).
 Patent and Trademark Office (PTO). Regulations administered by PTO provide for the export to a foreign country of unclassified technology in the form of a patent application or an amendment, modification, or supplement thereto or division thereof (37 CFR part 5). BIS has delegated authority under the Export Administration Act to the PTO to approve exports and reexports of such technology which is subject to the EAR. Exports and reexports of such technology not approved under PTO regulations must comply with the EAR.
 Department of Defense (DoD) and Department of State Foreign Military Sales (FMS) Program. Items that are subject to the EAR that are sold, leased or loaned by the Department of Defense to a foreign country or international organization under the FMS Program of the Arms Export Control Act pursuant to a Letter of Offer and Acceptance (LOA) authorizing such transfers are not “subject to the EAR,” but rather, are subject to the authority of the Arms Export Control Act.
 Prerecorded phonograph records reproducing in whole or in part, the content of printed books, pamphlets, and miscellaneous publications, including newspapers and periodicals; printed books, pamphlets, and miscellaneous publications including bound newspapers and periodicals; children's picture and painting books; newspaper and periodicals, unbound, excluding waste; music books; sheet music; calendars and calendar blocks, paper; maps, hydrographical charts, atlases, gazetteers, globe covers, and globes (terrestrial and celestial); exposed and developed microfilm reproducing, in whole or in part, the content of any of the above; exposed and developed motion picture film and soundtrack; and advertising printed matter exclusively related thereto.
 Information and “software” that:
 Are published, as described in 15 CFR §734.7;
 Arise during, or result from, fundamental research, as described in 15 CFR §734.8;
 Are released by instruction in a catalog course or associated teaching laboratory of an academic institution;
 Appear in patents or open (published) patent applications available from or at any patent office, unless covered by an invention secrecy order, or are otherwise patent information as described in 15 CFR §734.10;
 Are non-proprietary system descriptions; or
 Are telemetry data as defined in Note 2 to Category 9, Product Group E (see supplement no. 1 to 15 CFR part 774).

Export regulations in Armenia
Armenia is a member of World Trade Organization starting from 2003, and in conjunction with many other members of WTO, Armenia has made certain efforts to bring down the customs burdens and improve the ongoing customs system. One of the major objectives of Armenia foreign trade policy is to appeal to foreign direct investors and expand trade regimes. Furthermore, Armenia is a member of World Customs Organization and solicits the Harmonized System for tariff classification. Currently, there are only two applicable tariffs in Armenia on imports of goods: 0% and 10%. 0% tariff is applicable in the case of imports of capital goods, and 10% tariff is applicable for imports of consumer goods. Both consumer and capital imports are subject to VAT of 20%, and other imports of alcoholic products or beverages, tobacco by-products and fuel are subjected to excise tax. According to Armenian legislation policy, all goods and vehicles imported to the country are required to be declared in the Regional Customs House, where the importing organization operates, with the exception of Yerevan Zvartnots Customs House, Automobile Customs Point and TIR Customs House.

See also
International Traffic in Arms Regulations (ITAR)
Denied trade screening
United States embargoes
 Export control

References

External links
 Export Control Classification Number - US Department of Commerce
 Lists of Parties of Concern - US Department of Commerce

United States Department of Commerce
Military technology
Identifiers
Export and import control